Gelligaer Urban District Council was a local authority in Glamorgan, Wales. It was created in 1908 under the provisions of the 1894 Local Government of England and Wales Act and reflected the population increase in the upper Rhymney Valley. The Council existed until 1973. There were five wards.

The first councillors were elected on 30 September 1908. Most of the first members of the authority had served on the previous Rural District Council.

1908 Gelligaer Urban District council election

Fochriw Ward

Hengoed Ward

Pontlottyn Ward

Tirphil Ward

References

Elections in Wales
Glamorgan